is a Japanese table tennis player. She competed in the women's doubles event at the 1992 Summer Olympics.

References

1970 births
Living people
Japanese female table tennis players
Olympic table tennis players of Japan
Table tennis players at the 1992 Summer Olympics
Place of birth missing (living people)